Robert de Montalt, 2nd Baron Montalt (1270–1329) was the son of another Robert de Montalt, and a younger brother of Roger de Montalt, 1st Baron Montalt.

Robert de Montalt married Emma (-1297)  widow of Richard Fitz John (son of John Fitz Geoffrey, Justice of Ireland)

Robert de Montalt served in the Scottish and Gascon wars of Edward I and Edward II. De Montalt was summoned to Parliament as Baron Montalt in 1299.

His summons as Baron Montalt was not a continuation of the 1297 barony, but a new creation.

At his death in 1329, the barony became extinct.  When Robert died in 1329 he settled his lands on Queen Isabella (mother of K. Edward III) and thereafter to John of Eltham, brother to the King.

References

 Burke, Sir Bernard. "Montalt-Barons Montalt." A Genealogical History of the Dormant, Abeyant, Forfeited, and Extinct Peerages, of the British Empire. London: Wm Clowes and Sons, Ltd., 1962. p. 375.

Barons Montalt
1270 births
1329 deaths